Carmen C. Bambach (1959) is an American art historian and curator of Italian and Spanish drawings at the New York Metropolitan Museum of Art who specializes in Italian Renaissance art. She is considered one of the world's leading specialists on Leonardo da Vinci, especially his drawings.

Career 
Bambach received her bachelor's, master's, and doctoral degrees from Yale University.

As part of the 2017 Michelangelo, Bambach attributed a black chalk sketch to the artist in challenge to extant consensus.

She curated the Met's Michelangelo exhibition in 2017 and published the four-volume Leonardo da Vinci Rediscovered in 2019 to mixed reviews. The same year, she was the first recipient of many, for the Vilcek Prize for Excellence, recognizing work that reflects immigration's impact on American society.

Selected works

References

Sources

Further reading

External links 
 Published works at Academia.edu
 List of publications at the Met
 Leonardo da Vinci Rediscovered

Living people
1959 births
American art curators
American women curators
American art historians
Leonardo da Vinci scholars
People associated with the Metropolitan Museum of Art
Women art historians